The Roman Catholic Diocese of Neyyattinkara is a diocese located in the town of Neyyattinkara in the Ecclesiastical province of Trivandrum in India.

History
 June 14, 1996: Established as Diocese of Neyyattinkara from the Diocese of Trivandrum
The lion share of the population of Neyyattinkara Roman Catholic Diocese belong to major ethnic group of Nadar Community. The Holy Throne has established the Diocese of Neyyattinkara for the exclusive evangelisation of the area, progress and preservation of the Latin Catholic Minority.

Leadership
 Bishops of Neyyattinkara Roman Rite(Latin)
 Bishop Vincent Samuel (June 14, 1996 – present)

Saints and causes for canonisation
 Servant of God Fr. Adeodatus (Muthiyavila Valiyachan)

References

External links
 GCatholic.org 
 Catholic Hierarchy 

Roman Catholic dioceses in India
Christian organizations established in 1996
Roman Catholic dioceses and prelatures established in the 20th century
Dioceses in Kerala
1996 establishments in Kerala
Churches in Thiruvananthapuram district